Peeta Mellark is a fictional character from The Hunger Games trilogy by Suzanne Collins. He is portrayed by actor Josh Hutcherson in The Hunger Games film series.

Peeta is the male tribute representing District 12 in the 74th annual Hunger Games, alongside female tribute Katniss Everdeen (portrayed by Jennifer Lawrence). Together, they defy the rule that the Games must have one victor, unintentionally inciting a rebellion against the authoritarian government of Panem.

Appearances

The Hunger Games

Peeta is first introduced at the reaping for the 74th Hunger Games when he is selected as the male tribute representing District 12 alongside female tribute Katniss Everdeen. Prior to the reaping, Katniss and Peeta had only interacted once: at age eleven, when Peeta deliberately burned two loaves of bread in his family's bakery and took a beating from his abusive mother to feed a starving Katniss. Katniss had always felt indebted to him for this kindness, but never worked up the courage to thank him. Often, he would stare at her in school. Sometimes Katniss would make eye contact with him, only for his eyes to quickly flit away.

During an interview with Caesar Flickerman preceding the Games, Peeta admits on national television to having a long-standing crush on Katniss. She assumes this is merely part of his strategy to win favor from wealthy Capitol sponsors.

Once inside the arena, Peeta allies himself with the "Career" (from districts 1 and 2) tributes and tricks them into believing he will lead them to Katniss. However, after Katniss knocks down a hive of Tracker Jackers on her pursuers, she herself is stung with the insects venom, rendering her disoriented and vulnerable. Peeta urges Katniss to run and stays to fight fellow tribute Cato while she escapes. He survives the encounter with Cato but suffers a stab wound on his leg. He camouflages himself into the rocks and mud alongside a riverbank, slowly dying of blood poisoning until Katniss finds him days later.

Following an announcement proclaiming there can now be two winners, if both originate from the same district, Katniss and Peeta make allies of each other. Katniss realizes that if they play up the love story they may garner viewers' affections. Later a "feast" is announced, in which items each tribute needs desperately  will be placed on a table for them to take, organized by district. Peeta strongly suggests that Katniss does not go, knowing she will be in danger. She agrees to stay with him but, having received a bottle of sleep syrup from her mentor, Haymitch Abernathy, she puts him into a drug-induced sleep and seizes the opportunity to slip away to the feast. The medicine gifted to them by the Capitol is strong enough to heal both of their wounds by morning.

After killing Cato, Katniss and Peeta are the only remaining survivors. However, an announcement shortly afterwards revokes the previous revision, allowing for only one victor. Peeta suggests that Katniss should kill him, enabling her to return home. Katniss instead suggests they commit suicide by consuming poisonous berries known as Nightlock. Before the two are able to get the berries into their mouths, a final announcement is made pleading for the two to stop: both they and the viewers are informed that Katniss and Peeta are declared joint official winners of the 74th Hunger Games. Later, the two learn President Snow considered their actions to be an act of rebellion against the Capitol.

After their last interview, in which the two continue to affect their romantic feelings for one another, Peeta comes to the realization Katniss has staged her love for him all along.

Catching Fire

Peeta and Katniss embark on the Victory Tour, an event strategically timed in-between each Hunger Games, where the victors visit the other 11 districts as a reminder about the Games and for the Capitol to reinforce its power over the Districts. Peeta and Katniss have barely interacted since the Games; Peeta is angry with Katniss for faking affection for him, and Katniss is confused about her feelings and is uncomfortable to be with him because of her close friendship with Gale Hawthorne, who also has strong feelings for her.

Peeta expresses a desire to be friends with Katniss; while he knows she is stubborn and skilled in archery, he does not know her favorite color. Later, he tries to give part of his winnings to the families of District 11's most recently fallen tributes (Rue and Thresh) and is made to watch “Peacekeepers” kill a man who led the three finger salute to the two victors. Before the Victory Tour, President Snow visits Katniss and tells her he is aware that she was faking the affection towards Peeta, and that her actions in the arena have sparked a rebellion – one that can only be averted if she presents her and Peeta's attempt at joined suicide in the arena as an act of love-crazed teenagers rather than as defiance.

Katniss and Peeta think they are going to become mentors for the Quarter Quell, a special Hunger Games that occurs every 25 years and comes with a change in rules, usually to make them more gruesome than the normal Games so district citizens are reminded of the violence of Panem's first civil war; their loss is the reason the Games were established. The new twist for the 75th Games is that the tributes will be chosen from living victors. District 12 has only 3 living victors: Katniss, Peeta, and Haymitch, their constantly drunken mentor who won the 50th Hunger Games (the second Quarter Quell). President Snow draws the card showing what the theme of the Quarter Quell will be and announced, “.. that even the strongest among them cannot overcome the power of the Capitol, the tributes will be reaped from their existing pool of victors.” Katniss becomes the girl tribute, as she is the only living female District 12 victor. Peeta makes Haymitch promise to work to save Katniss, not him. He also vows that if Haymitch is chosen, he will volunteer in his place. Katniss makes Haymitch promise that if Peeta is the male tribute, she and Haymitch will work together to keep Peeta alive, even at the expense of Katniss's life. It is a torn alliance for Haymitch. When Haymitch is drawn as the male tribute, Peeta automatically volunteers to take his place. Many of the other returning tributes are friends with each other, but Katniss and Peeta have a disadvantage. They have met none of them, as they are the newest victors. Peeta hopes to play on their sympathies to gain protection from others in the arena and support from sponsors for Katniss. To this end, he lies to everybody on national television, saying Katniss and he had secretly got married before the Quell was announced, and that Katniss is pregnant. This shocks both Katniss and the whole of Panem.

At the cornucopia, Katniss allies with Finnick Odair, Mags, and Peeta.
Later, Peeta comes in contact with a force field and his heart stops. Katniss and Peeta’s efficient ally, Finnick Odair, succeeds in reviving him with CPR. Finnick Odair is the District 4 male victor tribute and a stunningly good-looking young man. The three soon band together with a few other tributes: Beetee and Wiress from District 3, and Johanna Mason from District 7. Eventually, they find out the arena is shaped like a clock, with 12 sections, and each section is triggered at the same time each day. Different hours indicated different tortures such as blood rain, acid fog, killer monkeys, a giant wave, and so on. During the daring time, Katniss then realizes that she also has feelings toward Peeta. As they formulate a plan to kill the remaining tributes, Wiress is killed and Katniss is attacked by Johanna. Once Katniss regains consciousness she realizes that Beetee had designed a way to destroy the force field surrounding the arena. She triggers it and destroys the field, setting off a chain of events. A rebel-controlled hovercraft arrives and rescues Katniss, Finnick, and Beetee. However, Peeta, Johanna, and Enobaria have been captured by the Capitol. Finnick, Beetee, Haymitch, Johanna, and a few other tributes were part of a plan to safely retrieve Katniss and Peeta from the arena with hopes that they would take on roles to start a revolution against the Capitol. Knowing that the Head Gamemaker, Plutarch Heavensbee, is secretly leading the revolution, Katniss goes to District 13, long believed to have been razed decades ago. Gale explains that after Katniss destroyed the arena, President Snow had District 12 firebombed. There is nothing left.

Mockingjay

Peeta is captured by the Capitol and is tortured physically, emotionally, and mentally. His feelings and memories are distorted with hallucinogenic tracker jacker venom, in a mind-control technique known as "Hijacking." The Capitol uses this method to turn Peeta against Katniss, making him believe that she is not only responsible for the death of his family, friends and the destruction of District 12, but also that she tried to kill him numerous times and that she is not even human, but rather an evil "mutt". This leads him to try and strangle Katniss when he is reunited with her in District 13. The doctors of District 13 try to undo his hijacking, but the process is slow and turns his terror into confusion, where he is unable to differentiate what is real and what is not, especially when it came to his love for Katniss.

When the rest of the victors' journey to the Capitol to fight, Peeta is initially kept behind because he is considered too unstable to be sent into combat. However, President Coin changes her mind and sends him not only into combat but assigns him to Katniss's squadron. Katniss theorizes that Coin has sent Peeta to remove her as an obstacle to Coin's future as President. Despite the fact that the members of the squadron do not trust him, they help with his recovery by creating a game called "Real or Not Real" in which Peeta will ask them a question about something he believes may be true and the members will confirm whether they are real or a hijacked memory. The squadron eventually comes to the conclusion that President Coin had deliberately sent Peeta to Katniss' squad in hopes that he will go mad and kill her because Coin sees Katniss as a political rival. Unfortunately, during a surprise attack of "pods" (deadly surprises such as flesh-melting light and mines triggered by people passing by), Peeta actually does lose his sanity temporarily in the midst of the chaos and tries to kill Katniss once again, but she rolls out of the way of his gun in an attempt to crush her skull. He becomes responsible at least in part for the death of one of their team members, who he accidentally throws into a barbed-wire net pod during the attack. The squadron repeatedly debate whether or not they should kill Peeta, and even Peeta himself asks to be killed to stop endangering them, but Katniss refuses to when realizing she cannot bring herself to let him die. She even kisses him for a period of time, which actually makes him stable.

Realizing he cannot convince anyone to kill him or leave him to die, Peeta insists on remaining cuffed instead since the pain in his wrists helps him stay focused in reality instead of succumbing to madness. Further on in the Capitol, the nightmares in Peeta's mind become so intense that he is on the brink of losing his sanity, but Katniss manages to reach him. After the rebels win the war, Katniss is driven to depression and mental instability due to the death of her sister, Prim. Peeta's hijacking is soon mostly recovered by several doctors and he is considered mentally stable and finally back to his former self. Upon returning home, he plants primroses, the flower which Prim was named after, in memory of her.

In the epilogue, Katniss and Peeta have two children together. It is implied by Katniss that Peeta wanted to have children first and took around 5–15 years to persuade Katniss to start a family. He still has moments where his hijacking will try to take over again, causing Peeta to clench onto something until the attempt passes.

Characterization

Peeta is the same age as Katniss, making him 16 years old in The Hunger Games and 17-18 in Catching Fire and Mockingjay.

Peeta is of "medium height, stocky build" and has "ashy blond hair that falls in waves over his forehead." He has blue eyes. He is "broad-shouldered and strong." Part of Peeta's left leg was amputated following the 74th Hunger Games, forcing him to walk with the aid of a prosthetic leg for the rest of his life. In the 2012 film adaptation, his leg is never amputated.

Peeta is repeatedly described as charming, generous, kind and likable, and possessing a self-deprecating sense of humour. He first confuses and later inspires Katniss with his determination to maintain his identity while inside the arena and his refusal to become a "piece" in the Capitol's game.

An accomplished painter and baker on account of working in his family's bakery his whole life (Suzanne Collins named the character Peeta because "Pita" is a kind of bread), Peeta also excels at hand-to-hand combat, camouflage, handling knives, and starting fires. Peeta also has a remarkable talent for speaking to crowds. People tend to "embrace everything he says." Not only is he initially responsible for making the Capitol fall in love with Katniss, Katniss herself says Peeta would be invaluable to the revolution because of his ability "to turn his pain into words that will transform people."

Critical reception

Entertainment Weekly said Peeta, as well as Gale Hawthorne, were "thinly imagined". MTV listed five reasons why Peeta is "badass", and that "Peeta gives [Katniss] a run for her money in the coolness category".

Film
On March 23, 2011, Lionsgate began casting the role of Peeta for the film of The Hunger Games. According to The Hollywood Reporter, contenders for the role included Josh Hutcherson, Alexander Ludwig (later cast as Cato), Hunter Parrish, Lucas Till, and Evan Peters. On April 4, 2011, Lionsgate announced that Hutcherson would play the role.

References

External links
Peeta Mellark on IMDb

Action film characters
Adventure film characters
Fictional amputees
Fictional artists
Fictional bakers
Fictional characters with post-traumatic stress disorder
Fictional child soldiers
Fictional North American people
Fictional revolutionaries
Fictional sole survivors
Fictional war veterans
The Hunger Games characters
Literary characters introduced in 2008
Male characters in film
Male characters in literature
Orphan characters in film
Orphan characters in literature
Teenage characters in film
Teenage characters in literature
Film characters introduced in 2012